Klaus Gamber (23 April 1919 in Ludwigshafen am Rhein - 2 June 1989 in Regensburg) was a German Catholic liturgist. Author of Die Reform der römischen Liturgie, which was subsequently translated into English and published as The Reform of the Roman Liturgy: Its Problems and Background, he was one of the principal intellectual critics of the liturgical reforms brought under the papacy of Paul VI. His critical work was praised by Cardinal Joseph Ratzinger (the later Pope Benedict XVI), and he is credited for being one of the academic inspirations behind the motu proprio Summorum Pontificum, allowing broader use of the 1962 Roman Missal.

References
BALDOVIN John F. Klaus Gamber and the post-Vatican II reform of the Roman Liturgy, Weston Jesuit School of Theology, Cambridge, Massachusetts, Studia liturgica, 2003
The Modern Rite: Collected Essays on the Reform of the Liturgy by Msgr. Klaus Gamber, St. Michaels Abbey Press, 2002. 96pp. 
Book review, AD2000

Catholic liturgy
German Roman Catholics
1919 births
1987 deaths